Revolve Theatre Company is a Henley-on-Thames based theatre company specialising in political and Shakespearean plays. The company is owned by Oliver Dench, Joe Morris and Tom Smith.

History
Revolve Theatre Company was formed in the summer of 2014 while working together at Henley Theatre Services. The company was formed after the three founders discussed what they liked and didn't like about the theatre. It was then that they decided to create Revolve, a company that strips the vanity and indulgence from theatre and focus on the art. The aim of Revolve is to offer something educational and inspiring and to the theatre scene of Oxfordshire and Berkshire.

Education
Revolve believe in the educative and political powers of theatre, especially through Shakespearean language. Besides delivering performances completely unique to Revolve, the company strive to take their rendition of Hamlet to schools, to teach young minds about the beauty of Shakespearean language from an idiosyncratic perspective.

Debut Performance
The first performance by Revolve was a One-Man adaptation of Hamlet, in which artistic director, Oliver Dench, performed a total of 15 roles. The play was written using Bard's original text and was debuted at the Henley Fringe festival in July, 2014. The performance' warm welcome has inspired Revolve to take their adaptation of the historic play to new ventures in the future.

Patronage
Dame Judi Dench, Oliver Dench's Great Aunt, agreed to sign on as patron for the company in July 2014.

References

Theatre companies in England